Tutrakan Peak is a rocky peak of 810 m in the Levski Ridge of the Tangra Mountains on Livingston Island in the South Shetland Islands, Antarctica surmounting Devnya Valley to the east, and Huron Glacier and its tributaries to the north and west.  The peak is named after the town of Tutrakan in northeastern Bulgaria.

Location

The peak was surveyed in the Bulgarian topographic survey Tangra 2004/05 and mapped in 2005 and 2009.

Maps
 L.L. Ivanov et al. Antarctica: Livingston Island and Greenwich Island, South Shetland Islands. Scale 1:100000 topographic map. Sofia: Antarctic Place-names Commission of Bulgaria, 2005.
 L.L. Ivanov. Antarctica: Livingston Island and Greenwich, Robert, Snow and Smith Islands. Scale 1:120000 topographic map.  Troyan: Manfred Wörner Foundation, 2009.

References
 Tutrakan Peak. SCAR Composite Antarctic Gazetteer
 Bulgarian Antarctic Gazetteer. Antarctic Place-names Commission. (details in Bulgarian, basic data in English)

External links
 Tutrakan Peak. Copernix satellite image

Tangra Mountains